Antonio De La Fuente (August 24, 1902 –  3 January 1970) was an American professional boxer in the Heavyweight division. He was born in Prescott, Arizona into a Mexican American family.

Professional career
In August 1932 De La Fuente upset the undefeated Red Fields via decision over sixth rounds. The bout was held in Des Moines, Iowa.

References

External links

American boxers of Mexican descent
Boxers from Arizona
Heavyweight boxers
1902 births
1970 deaths
American male boxers